Zagarino is a village (selo) under administrative jurisdiction of the urban-type settlement of Mogzon in Khiloksky District of Zabaykalsky Krai, Russia, located on the right bank of the Khilok River.

It was founded in 1895–1896 as a flag station of Zagarin of the Trans-Siberian Railway.  It is now a dying village.  The railway station provided employment to all of the inhabitants of the village, but it closed up in 1994.  This caused a significant population decrease: from 133 people recorded in 1990 to 58 in 2002.

References
The Encyclopedia of Zabaykalye

Rural localities in Zabaykalsky Krai